The South African Special Forces Brigade, colloquially known as the Recces, is South Africa's principal special operations unit, specialising in various types of operations including; counter-insurgency, long-range-reconnaissance, unconventional-warfare, special operations, hostage-rescue, and direct-action operations. The brigade operates with two active-duty groups, with 4 Special Forces Regiment focusing on maritime operations, and 5 Special Forces Regiment focusing on land and airborne operations. Only about 8% of recruits who undergo South African special forces training pass the course.

The South African Special Forces Brigade has its roots in the Hunter Group, which was formed in 1968 as an elite counter-insurgency unit of the South African Army. The success of this unit culminated in the subsequent formation of five reconnaissance units, known widely as "Recces", during the 1970s. South African special forces carried out a number of combat operations during the Rhodesian Bush War, the South African Border War, and the Mozambican Civil War. 
 
The Special Forces Brigade's current structure is the result of extensive restructuring related to the integration of the South African National Defence Force (SANDF) between 1992 and 1996. Elements of the brigade are expanded into two additional groups; though termed "regiments", they consist only of small numbers of operators who are secretive, seldom photographed, and expertly trained. The current regiments include 4 Special Forces Regiment based at Langebaan in Western Cape Province, and 5 Special Forces Regiment based at Phalaborwa in the northern part of the province of Limpopo.

Special forces are directly under the command of the Joint Operations Division of the SANDF, and unlike other similar forces worldwide, is not a part of the South African Army nor the South African Navy, but is rather operated as its own branch/service within the SANDF.

History 
The first South African Special Forces unit, 1 Reconnaissance Commando, was established in the town of Oudtshoorn, Cape Province on 1 October 1972. On 1 January 1975, this unit was relocated to Durban, Natal, where it continued its activities as the airborne specialist unit of the special forces.

Later, five additional Reconnaissance Commandos were formed:
 2 Reconnaissance Commando (Citizen Force) – was established in Johannesburg. It was later retired due to rationalisation and the discontinuation of the Citizen Force unit concept
 3 Reconnaissance Commando (consisting of former Rhodesian Selous Scouts) – was established in Phalaborwa. An attempt to integrate this unit into the South African Military was largely unsuccessful. The unit was disbanded in 1981, and the limited number of remaining personnel were incorporated into the other Special Forces unit.
 4 Reconnaissance Commando, specialising in seaborne operations, was established in the coastal town of Langebaan, Cape Province.
 5 Reconnaissance Commando was established at the Duku-Duku camp in Natal, but was later moved to Phalaborwa in the Transvaal province.
 6 Reconnaissance Commando (consisting of former Rhodesian Special Air Service) – was established in Durban. An attempt to integrate this unit into the South African Military was largely unsuccessful. It was disbanded in 1981, and the limited number of remaining personnel were incorporated into the other Special Forces units.

Many white members of the Rhodesian special forces were recruited into the SADF in 1980 as part of Operation Winter and served with the South African Special Forces.

On 1 January 1981, a re-organisation of Special Forces took place, as part of which the Reconnaissance Commandos and other special forces were transformed into an independent formation, directly under the command of the (then) South African Defence Force (instead of the South African Army). As part of the re-organisation, the various Reconnaissance Commandos were also given the status of regiments. In the latter part of the same decade, a Special Forces headquarters and a Special Forces stores depot were also added to the Special Forces structure.

Between the years 1981 and 1990, Special Forces was home to unconventional operations such as Project Barnacle, the Civil Cooperation Bureau and other operations conducted under the aegis of 7 Medical Battalion Group.

In 1991, the structure of the special forces underwent another change, when the special forces headquarters was disbanded and a Directorate Reconnaissance, reporting directly to the Chief of the Army, was established instead.

Another organisational change followed in 1993, when the Directorate Reconnaissance became 45 Parachute Brigade.  As a result of this, all the units were renamed: 1 Reconnaissance Regiment became 452 Parachute Battalion, 4 Reconnaissance Regiment became 453 Parachute Battalion and 5 Reconnaissance Regiment became 451 Parachute Battalion.

As part of the military rationalization process, 1 Special Forces Regiment was disbanded in 1996. Its personnel were incorporated into the other Special Forces Regiments.

In 1997, the Special Forces School was transferred to 5 Special Forces Regiment upon the retirement of 1 Special Forces Regiment where the School had previously been based. The Special Forces School was transferred out of 5 Special Forces Regiment in 2002, to become a stand-alone unit.

Structure 
The Special Forces Brigade, as it is now known, consists of:

Headquarters

Based in Pretoria. The General Officer Commanding (GOC) Special Forces commands, controls and coordinates the activities of the various SF Regiments from a headquarters (HQ) located in the Swartkop Park nature reserve on the southwestern outskirts of Pretoria. Colloquially called "Speskop", the headquarters also houses the Special Forces' operational planning as well as administrative support staffs.

4 Special Forces Regiment
4 Special Forces Regiment is based in Langebaan, Saldanha Bay, on the west coast north of Cape Town. It provides South Africa its seaward Special Forces capability. The unit was established at Langebaan in 1978. The Regiment consists of three operational commandos (companies) as well as a Special Forces Amphibious and Urban School.

5 Special Forces Regiment
5 Special Forces Regiment is based in Phalaborwa in the east of the northern Limpopo Province, and was established in Durban in 1976. After a sojourn at Duku Duku in northern KwaZulu-Natal, the unit moved into its present lines in 1980. Its post-2002 structure provides for two operational commandos and a training wing. It specialises in overland operations, especially long-range infiltration, intelligence gathering and airborne operations.

South African Special Forces Reserve
Retired Special Forces personnel form part of the Special Forces Reserve. They are assigned to the various Special Forces Regiments as required.

South African Special Forces School
Based in Murrayhill, the South African Special Forces School is responsible for the presentation of the Special Forces Pre-Selection and Selection courses and ongoing training.

South African Special Forces Supply Unit
The South African Special Forces Supply Unit provides logistical support and is based in Walmansthal, North of Pretoria.

In the Special Forces regiments, leadership positions, especially at team (section) and group (platoon) level, have traditionally been dictated more by ability and experience than rank. This has, on occasion, resulted in Operators more senior in rank being assigned to groups or teams commanded by Operators junior to them in rank but more seasoned in operational experience or actual command.

Selection and Training 
The Ultimate Challenge, as South African Special Forces Selection is often called, is considered one of the most difficult special forces selection courses in the world. A soldier must meet very high requirements to even attend Special Forces Selection. In accordance with SANDF regulations, only South African citizens under a certain age are permitted to apply.

Pre-selection testing

This includes all aspects of psychological and physical tests. For the psychological tests, soldiers are given written tests and oral interviews with Special Forces NCOs. A soldier must be self-controlled and mature. Soldiers are ejected from the course if there is any suggestion of mental instability. The Physical Test includes for example 50 continuous push ups without breaking rhythm, 67 sit ups in two minutes, 175-metre fireman's lift run within 65 seconds, 5-kilometre run within 24 minutes, a rope climb and 40 six-metre shuttle runs in 95 seconds. A student must also scale a  wall, complete a fifteen-kilometre march in less than 120 minutes and perform 120 shuttle kicks.

Parachute selection course

All Special Forces candidates who aren't already parachute-qualified have to attend, and pass, the Basic Parachute School.

Special Forces selection

Selection is an event during which candidates are placed in an extremely mentally and physically demanding set of situations and circumstances, through which they must pass. It is in duration approximately a week.

For the duration of Selection, the candidates do not sleep or eat, and have no rest period at all. Only an extremely small percentage of those who begin Selection ever pass it. In some years, no-one has managed to pass Selection, and there are other cases where only 1 or 2 out of an entire Selection group of approximately 120 have passed.

Training cycle

Once past the Selection process, an aspiring operator will be placed on a training cycle to acquire the skills required. These include: air co-operation, water orientation, obstacle crossing, bushcraft, tracking and survival, demolitions and tactics in urban as well as rural areas.

Advanced Airborne Training: a recruit will attend courses in military free-fall such as HALO and HAHO. They will also learn about helicopter operations – how to descend by means of a rope out of helicopters (fast-roping and rappel ). Combat extraction is also taught, along with learning how to set up a Landing Zone.

Land training consists of many things: including sniping, demolitions and reconnaissance. Bushcraft and survival is also taught. Climbing and photography are taught to new recruits. Urban and rural combat is perhaps the newest training – developed quite recently, this training provided South Africa with a new counter-terrorist force. Medical and communications training is also given to those who wish to become qualified in these fields.

Maritime training consists of the use of small boats, underwater demolitions, swimming, combat diving, diving, beach reconnaissance and navigation.

Operations

1973–94 SADF Operations

The South African "Recces" were deployed to many local hot spots during the late 1970s and early 1980s, particularly Angola.

The main enemy then was South West Africa's People Organization whose armed wing PLAN, was a guerrilla organization fighting for an independent Namibia.

One of the "Recces"' most effective operations came in 1982: Operation Mebos penetrated deep into Angola and destroyed the SWAPO Headquarters. In Operation Askari, in the winter of 1984, the "Recces" cut off almost all supply lines to and from the SWAPO in Angola. In May 1985, a "Recce" team undertook the controversial Operation Argon, a failed attempt to sabotage Angolan oil installations run by Gulf Oil.

In early summer of 1985, another "Recce" team under the command of SADF Captain André Diedericks crossed into Angola's Cuando Cubango province, and with UNITA's help, protection and escort was secretly deployed around Menongue area. The team had at their disposal the 9K31 "Strela-1" AA system manned and operated by the team members. The Team's mission was to carry out covert combat operations, code names "Catamaran 1," "Catamaran 2" and "Cerberus" with the goal of disrupting air traffic in Cuando Cubango province by shooting down air transports, combat aircraft and gunships using the AA system.

The "Islander", en route from Menongue to Cuito Cuanavale with a crew of 2 and 5 passengers, was also carrying 69 million kwanzas (Angola's currency), several months of salary for FAPLA's 16th Brigade's personnel based in Cuito Cuanavale. When the "Islander" fell to the ground the money was stolen and the remains of the dead passengers had been pillaged by UNITA soldiers attached to protect the "Recce" team.
On 25 November 1985, the same "Recce" team had also shot down an "Aeroflot" Antonov AN-12 of the Soviet Air Force. All people on board (twelve Soviet and nine Angolan nationals) died in the crash.

Post-1994 SANDF Operations

Central African Republic

Operators of the South African Special Forces were involved in direct action against the Séléka rebels in the Fight for Bangui during the South African military assistance to the Central African Republic. No South African Special Forces operators were killed in the operation. All casualties were attributed to 1 Parachute Battalion which lost 13 soldiers, with a further 27 injured, during pitched battles on the outskirts of the capital, Bangui.

Democratic Republic of the Congo

An operator of the South African Special Forces, as part of the Force Intervention Brigade, made the 8th longest recorded sniper kill in history with a confirmed distance of  using a South African made Denel NTW-20 anti-materiel rifle in its  configuration.

Mozambique

 teams were deployed to Cabo Delgado Province under Operation Vikela. On 20 December 2021 an operator, Corporal Tebogo Edwin Radebe, was killed in action.

Insignia

Operator's Badge 

All members who complete all the required qualifications to become a Special Forces Operator, are awarded an "Operator's Badge". Each badge is numbered and a register of the numbers and who they have been awarded to is kept.
The badge consists of an inverted Commando Knife within a laurel wreath, which is meant to symbolise both special forces (the knife) and victory (the wreath).

Standard operator badges are silver, but a gold badge with an embedded diamond is awarded to Operators with more than 10 years of active service.

New badges have been designed for wear on the camouflage combat dress. These are black embossed plastic on a thatch green background.

Attack Diver

Demolitions

Tracking

Additional proficiency badges 
 
 
  Paratrooper Freefall

Known Equipment

Weaponry

Vehicles

Leadership

Brigade

Regiments

Disbanded units

Notes

References

Further reading

External links 

South African Special Forces League website
Specwarnet.com report
Specialoperations.com report
Training account
Samples of recces emblems

1972 establishments in South Africa
Military units and formations in Pretoria
Brigades of South Africa
Special forces of South Africa
Military units and formations of South Africa in the Border War
Military units and formations established in 1972